Folk Songs is a 2009 album by the Scottish singer-songwriter James Yorkston in collaboration with the Big Eyes Family Players. As the title suggests, all of the tracks are traditional British and Irish folk songs (along with one from Galicia, Spain). Many of them are versions of songs recorded by singers in the 1960s British folk revival, such as Nic Jones, Anne Briggs and Shirley Collins.

Critical reception
The album received generally positive reviews from the music press. Writing in The Guardian, Robin Denselow called it, "One of the more intriguing folk albums of the summer", commenting, "It's an album of strong songs, and may well prompt a new audience to check out the earlier recordings." The website The Quietus said the album was, "a fine tribute to the folk tradition of a musician taking long established songs, putting his own mark on the tested formulas and then passing them on for consumption by whoever encounters them along the road."

Track listing
"Hills of Greenmoor"
"Just as the Tide was Flowing"
"Martinmas Time"
"Mary Connaught & James O'Donnell"
"Thorneymoor Woods"
"I Went to Visit the Roses"
"Pandeirada de Entrimo"
"Little Musgrave"
"Rufford Park Poachers"
"Sovay"
"Low Down in the Broom"

Folk Songs II
In 2012, the Big Eyes Family Players released a follow-up album entitled Folk Songs II on Static Caravan Recordings, featuring a variety of guest vocalists including James Yorkston, Alasdair Roberts, Elle Osborne and Adrian Crowley.

References

2009 albums
Domino Recording Company albums
James Yorkston albums